The Kouga Dam is an arch dam on the Kouga River about  west of Patensie in Kouga Local Municipality, South Africa. It supplies irrigation water to the Kouga and Gamtoos valleys as well as drinking water to the Port Elizabeth metropolitan area via the Loerie Balancing Dam. It was constructed between 1957 and 1969.

The dam can be accessed by following the R330 and then the R331 from the N2 at Humansdorp. All but the last  is tarred road and there is a short tunnel just before the dam wall.

It was named the Paul Sauer Dam after Paul Sauer, but was renamed in 1995.

Kouga Dam Power Station
There are three 1200 kVA hydroelectric turbines at the base of the dam, but they are currently not in use.

See also

 List of reservoirs and dams in South Africa
 List of rivers of South Africa
South African Department of Water Affairs and Forestry

References

External links
 South African Water Research Commission

Dams completed in 1969
Buildings and structures in the Eastern Cape
Kouga Local Municipality
Dams in South Africa
Arch dams
1969 establishments in South Africa